Martha Mijares (19 January 1938 – 18 October 2018) was a Mexican film actress. She appeared in twenty seven films between 1954 and 1960 including the crime adventure Raffles. She belongs to the Golden Age of Mexican cinema.

Selected filmography
 When I Leave (1954)
 Raffles (1958)
 Where Are Our Children Going? (1958)

References

Bibliography
 Sicre, Jose Gomez. Dolores del Rio. General Secretariat of the Organization of American States, 1970.

External links

1938 births
2018 deaths
Mexican film actresses
20th-century Mexican actresses
Actresses from Mexico City